Muzyka Poważna is the second collaborative album by Polish rapper Pezet, a member of Płomień 81; and Polish producers Noon, a member of Grammatik, and Ajron (Michał Dąbal).

Track list

Polish-language albums
2004 albums

pl:Muzyka poważna